Aaron Gorrell (born 31 March 1981) is an Australian former professional rugby league footballer who played as a  in the 2000s. He played for the St. George Illawarra Dragons and the Brisbane Broncos in  the NRL, and for the Catalans Dragons in the Super League.

Background
Gorrell was born in Wollongong, New South Wales, Australia.

Playing career
Gorrell was made famous by slotting in the last-minute conversion in a round 15, 2006 game against the Brisbane Broncos at Suncorp Stadium. The Dragons won the match 18-16. Gorrell had converted rookie Brett Morris' try in the 78th minute after coach Nathan Brown gave him the goal-kicking duties after Mathew Head had kicked the last two conversions.

In 2007 he joined Catalans Dragons for their second season in the Super League. With his NRL experience he proved a key influence in the opening rounds of the season, before suffering a season-ending knee injury in round four which required a knee reconstruction. It was confirmed by the Brisbane Broncos on 27 September that Aaron Gorrell has signed with them for the 2009 season, where he will fill the vacancy left by the departing Michael Ennis.

Gorrell played his first match for the Brisbane Broncos in round 1 of the 2009 NRL season.

Gorrell played for and coached the Queanbeyan Kangaroos in the Canberra Raiders cup between 2012 and 2017 but then moved into a full time coach role with the club in 2018.

Career highlights

Junior Club: Albion Park-Oak Flats
First Grade Debut: Round 5, St George Illawarra v Parramatta, WIN Stadium, 14 April 2002
First Grade Record: 2002 - 2006 8 tries & 94 goals
Super League: 2007-2010 signing with Catalans Dragons

References

External links

Super League profile
Aaron Gorrell Official Player Profile
Aaron Gorrell NRL Profile

1981 births
Living people
Australian rugby league players
Brisbane Broncos players
Catalans Dragons players
Rugby league five-eighths
Rugby league hookers
Rugby league players from Wollongong
St. George Illawarra Dragons players